Hugh Cameron (March 18, 1836 – May 11, 1918) was a Canadian politician and a member of the House of Commons of Canada for the riding of Iverness in Nova Scotia.

He was born in Antigonish County, Nova Scotia, the son of Alexander Cameron and Liz Cameron. Cameron studied at Saint Francis Xavier College and, in 1861, graduated in medicine from the University of Pennsylvania and also from the School of Practical Obstetrics in Philadelphia. He practiced medicine at Mabou in Cape Breton. He studied further at Bellevue Hospital medical school in New York City from 1864 to 1865 before returning to his practice. Cameron also served as surgeon for the militia.

He was elected as a member of the Anti-Confederation Party to the 1st Canadian Parliament on September 20, 1867. He became a member of the Liberal-Conservative Party on January 30, 1869. Though he was defeated in the following three elections, he was re-elected to the 5th Canadian Parliament on June 20, 1882, and to the two following Parliaments. He became a member of the Conservative Party on April 13, 1887. Cameron was appointed in the Legislative Council of Nova Scotia in 1879, serving until 1882.

References

Anti-Confederation Party MPs
Conservative Party of Canada (1867–1942) MPs
Members of the House of Commons of Canada from Nova Scotia
Conservative Party of Nova Scotia MLCs
1836 births
1918 deaths